Henry "Harry" Constable (1854 – 17 February 1881) was a British flat racing jockey of the Victorian era.   He was the Champion Jockey of 1873 with 110 winners, denying the famous Fred Archer his first Jockeys' Championship by 3 wins.  He also won the 1878 Derby on Sefton.  His fame was short-lived though, and he died at a young age in 1881 aged 26.  He was the favourite jockey of Lord Rosebery.

References

Bibliography

1854 births
1881 deaths
English jockeys
People from Kensal Green
British Champion flat jockeys